Global Village Telecom (GVT) was a Brazilian telecommunications company that offers services on landline telephone, broadband for both consumer and business, Pay TV and voice over IP. GVT has been in the market since the end of 2000. GVT today operates under the Vivo brand.

History 

Global Village Telecom was founded in April 1998 by a group of Israeli investors led by entrepreneur Joshua Levinberg, who previously founded Gilat Satellite Networks. Their idea was to build a satellite-based phone network for remote locations in South America  using the VSAT technology that was developed by Gilat Satellite Networks. The initial investors in the company included: Magnum Technologies Fund, which held 55% of the company, US investment bank Merrill Lynch held 20%, Clal Information Technologies 10%, Discount Investment Corporation 10%, and Gilat Satellite Networks 5%.

During 1998 and 1999 GVT won tenders to build rural phone networks in Colombia, Chile and Peru.

Brazil Fixed-line Telecommunications Licence 
In 1999 GVT was awarded a 20 years license to provide fixed-line telecommunications services in Brazil's south and central regions. As part of Brazil's government plan to introduce competition in three fixed-line regions of the country. When it privatized the state telecommunications company, Telebras, in 1998, the government divided Brazil into three regions for fixed-line telephony. Each region was to have one newcomer and an incumbent. In each case, the incumbent was a former unit of Telebras, which was privatized.

The region for which GVT won the license had a population of 38 million people at the time and encompasses nine states, including the country's capital, Brasilia. GVT plan was to invest US$550 million over three years and to build a network with 500,000 lines. GVT was to compete in the region against the former Telebras unit Tele Centro Sul, which was owned by a consortium led by Telecom Italia.

In 2001, GVT was split between Gilat Satellite Networks and the other investors in the company. Gilat took over the Colombia and Peru operations and GVT remained solely focused on the Brazilian market.

Initial public offering
In 2007, GVT had an initial public offering on the Brazilian Stock Market, achieving a market cap of $1.2 billion and raising $480 million.

Sale to Vivendi and then to Telefónica
The French company Vivendi bought a 58% stake of the company by the end of 2009, and raised its participation to 99.17% the following year.

On August 30, 2014, Vivendi announces the sale of GVT to Telefónica for 7.5 billion GBP.

Products and services 

GVT is a company that offers high-speed broadband across its area of operation, pay TV with paid high-definition channels, as well as integrated and convergent advanced landline telephony.

The company offers broadband internet connection through ADSL, ADSL2 +, VDSL2 and FTTH technologies. It offers content and Internet services through the online portal POP, besides VoIP services through VONO to residential and micro-enterprise customers in Brazil (also usable outside the country). In 2012, the company also started to offer Pay TV packages.

GVT offers internet speeds of 15 Mbit/s, 25 Mbit/s, 35 Mbit/s, 50 Mbit/s and 150 Mbit/s, to all the 149 cities it serves, except in Erechim e Montenegro (Rio Grande do Sul); Paranaguá (Paraná); Porto Velho (Rondônia); Palmas, e Rio Branco (Acre), where speeds up to 20Mbit/s are supported.

Strategically, GVT built a network prepared for the convergence of voice, data and image, enabling it to offer higher than market average speeds since the beginning of its operation in 2000. Currently, circa 70% of annual company investment is dedicated to expansion and  improvement of the network.

The average Internet speed of GVT customer base reached 13.2Mbit/s in October 2013. The index is greater than the average speed of Brazilian Internet (2.4 Mbit/s) and countries with large technology development as South Korea (13.3Mbit/s) and USA (8.6Mbit/s) – source:  Akamai Institute.

It is considered the best Brazilian broadband for five consecutive years (2009-2013) according to the open survey made with INFO Magazine readers  and the best telecommunication company by Isto É Magazine in 2013. In addition, the company won the EXAME/IBRC Award for best customer service in the fixed telephony category.

GVT also serves the enterprise segment, providing products and services, offering integrated solutions and managed services including fixed-line telephony, unified communication systems, hosted VoIP, Internet services, private-data networks and Data Center services.

Coverage 
Currently, GVT backbone covers 20 states: Acre, Alagoas, Bahia, Ceará, Espírito Santo, Goiás, Minas Gerais, Mato Grosso do Sul, Mato Grosso, Paraíba, Paraná,  Pernambuco, Rondônia, Rio Grande do Norte,  Sergipe, Tocantins, São Paulo and Rio de Janeiro, plus Distrito Federal (Brazil capital).

São Paulo
São Paulo, Araraquara, Arujá, Bauru, Campinas, Guarulhos, Indaiatuba, Jundiaí, Mauá, Mogi das Cruzes, Osasco, Piracicaba, Santo André, Santos, São Bernardo do Campo, Ribeirão Preto, São Vicente, Sorocaba, Suzano, Várzea Paulista and Votorantim.

Minas Gerais
Belo Horizonte, Betim, Contagem, Governador Valadares, Ipatinga, Coronel Fabriciano and Juiz de Fora.

Espírito Santo
Vitória, Cariacica, Colatina, Linhares, Serra and Vila Velha.

Rio de Janeiro
Rio de Janeiro, Campos dos Goytacazes, Duque de Caxias, Nilópolis, Niterói, Nova Iguaçu and São Gonçalo.

Mato Grosso
Cuiabá, Várzea Grande and Rondonópolis.

Goiás
Goiânia, Anápolis, Aparecida de Goiânia, Cidade Ocidental, Luziânia, Rio Verde, Senador Canedo, Trindade and Valparaíso de Goiás.

Mato Grosso do Sul
Campo Grande e Dourados.

Distrito Federal
Brasília, Brazilândia, Cruzeiro, Paranoá, Planaltina, Samambaia, Santa Maria, São Sebastião, Sobradinho and Taguatinga. (Administrative regions of Federal District)

Alagoas
Maceió.

Bahia
Salvador, Alagoinhas, Camaçari, Feira de Santana, Lauro de Freitas and Simões Filho.

Ceará
Fortaleza, Caucaia and Maracanaú.

Paraíba
João Pessoa, Campina Grande and Santa Rita.

Pernambuco
Recife, Camaragibe, Caruaru, Gravatá, Jaboatão dos Guararapes, Olinda, Paulista and Vitória de Santo Antão.

Rio Grande do Norte
Natal.

Sergipe
Aracaju.

Acre
Rio Branco.

Rondônia
Porto Velho.

Tocantins
Palmas.

See also
 List of internet service providers in Brazil

References

External links 
  Official website (archived)

Telecommunications companies of Brazil
Internet service providers of Brazil
Companies based in Curitiba
2000 establishments in Brazil
Telecommunications companies established in 2000
Former Vivendi subsidiaries